The Clinton County Chaos is a team of the Women's Spring Football League based in Blanchester, Ohio, USA, and were set to begin its first season of play in 2011. The Chaos is now one of six women's football teams based in Ohio. The other five are in the Women's Football Alliance, which the Chaos was originally going to be part of.

Season by season

|-
|2011 || -- || -- || -- || -- || --
|-

External links 
Clinton County Chaos official website

Women's Spring Football League teams
Clinton County, Ohio
American football teams in Ohio
American football teams established in 2011
2011 establishments in Ohio
Women's sports in Ohio